The g-force associated with an object is its acceleration relative to free-fall.

G-force may also refer to:

Arts and entertainment
 G Force, a 1983 album by Kenny G
 G-Force (film), a 2009 live-action film by Disney
 G-Force (video game), a 2009 video game based on the film
 G-Force, a group from Battle of the Planets
 G-Force: Guardians of Space, the second English adaptation of Gatchaman, following Battle of the Planets
 "G-Force", a song by Sonic Youth, from The Whitey Album
 G-Force (album), a 1980 album by the band of the same name led by Gary Moore
 G-Force (dance group), a dance group in the Philippines associated with ASAP 2012
 G-Force (Godzilla), a fictional military organization tasked with the monitoring of Godzilla

Technology
 G-Force Technologies, a racing car constructor, now owned by Élan Motorsport Technologies
 G-Force, a guitar effects processor by TC Electronic
 G Force (Dyson), a vacuum cleaner by Dyson
 G Force (roller coaster), a roller coaster at Drayton Manor Theme Park

See also
 GeForce, a graphics card brand name of Nvidia